Corina Martín (born December 19, 1969) is an Argentine sprint canoer who competed in the late 1980s. At the 1988 Summer Olympics in Seoul, she was eliminated in the repechages of the K-2 500 m event.

References
Sports-reference.com profile

1969 births
Argentine female canoeists
Canoeists at the 1988 Summer Olympics
Living people
Olympic canoeists of Argentina
Place of birth missing (living people)
Pan American Games medalists in canoeing
Pan American Games bronze medalists for Argentina
Medalists at the 1987 Pan American Games
Canoeists at the 1987 Pan American Games